Clairville may refer to:

Locations

America
An alternate name for Davisville, West Virginia

Canada

Ontario
Clairville, Toronto, a former village and neighbourhood in Toronto
Claireville, Brampton, the portion of the village in Brampton
Claireville Conservation Area, in Brampton

Elsewhere
Clairville, an unincorporated community in Weldford Parish, New Brunswick, Canada

People
Clairville (Louis-François Nicolaïe) (1811–1879), the pseudonym of the French author Louis-François Nicolaïe
Joseph Philippe de Clairville (1742–1830), Swiss botanist